The rebab (rabāba, variously spelled rebap, rubob, rebeb, rababa, rabeba, robab, rubab, rebob, etc) is the name of several related string instruments that independently spread via Islamic trading routes over much of North Africa, Southeast Asia, the Middle East, and parts of Europe. The instrument is typically bowed, but is sometimes plucked. It is one of the earliest known bowed instruments, named no later than the 8th century, and is the parent of many bowed and stringed instruments.

Variants
There are chiefly 3 main types:

A long-necked bowed variety that often has a spike at the bottom to rest on the ground (see first image to the right); thus this is called a spike fiddle in certain areas. Some of the instruments developing from this have vestigial spikes.

A short-necked double-chested or "boat-shaped" variant; here plucked versions like the Maghreb rebab and the kabuli rebab (sometimes referred to as the robab or rubab) also exist.

Besides the spike fiddle variant, there also exists a variant with a pear-shaped body, quite similar to the Byzantine lyra and the Cretan lyra. This latter variant travelled to western Europe in the 11th century, and became the rebec. This rabāb is the ancestor of many European bowed instruments,  including the rebec and the lyra, though not of those bowed instruments in the lyre family such as the crwth, jouhikko, talharpa and gue.

This article will only concentrate on the spike-fiddle rebab, which usually consists of a small, usually rounded body, the front of which is covered in a membrane such as parchment or sheepskin and has a long neck attached. There is a long thin neck with a pegbox at the end and there are one, two or three strings. There is no fingerboard. The instrument is held upright, either resting on the lap or on the floor. The bow is usually more curved than that of the violin.

The rebab, though valued for its voice-like tone, has a very limited range (a little over an octave), and was gradually replaced throughout much of the Arab world by the violin and kemenche. The Iraqi version of the instrument (jawza or joza) has four strings.

Construction
The rebab is used in a wide variety of musical ensembles and genres, corresponding with its wide distribution, and is built and played somewhat differently in different areas. Following the principle of construction in Iran, Ahvaz, the rebab is a large instrument with a range similar to the viola da gamba, whereas versions of the instrument further west tend to be smaller and higher-pitched.  The body varies from being ornately carved, as in Java, to simpler models such as the 2-string Egyptian "fiddle of the Nile." They may have a body made of half a coconut shell, while the more sophisticated versions have a metal soundbox, and the front may be half-covered with beaten copper, and half with cowskin.

History

According to Richard Wallaschek, bowed rebab was developed under Mohammedan culture. The rebab was heavily used, and continues to be used, in Arabic Bedouin music and is mentioned by Johann Ludwig Burckhardt in his travelog Travels in Arabia:

"Of instruments they possess only the rababa, (a kind of guitar,) the ney, (a species of clarinet,) and the tambour, or tambourine."

It is called "joza" in Iraq, named after the sound box material made of a coconut shell. There is also a bowed instrument in Persian music named Kamanche which has similar shape and structure. It spread to different regions including South East Asia through Islamic trading routes.

For a famous Iranian singer and rebab player see Hassaan Egzaar Chenani.

Southeast Asia 
In the Indonesian gamelan the rebab is an essential elaborating instrument, ornamenting the basic melody. A two-string bowed lute consisting of a wooden body, traditionally though now rarely a single coconut shell, covered with very fine stretched skin. Two brass strings are tuned a fifth apart and the horse hair bow is tied loosely (unlike modern Western stringed instruments) with the proper tension controlled by the players bow hand, contributing to the difficult technique. There are typically two per ensemble, one for pelog and one for slendro, never played together.

The rebab does not have to conform exactly to the scale of the other gamelan instruments and can be played in relatively free time, finishing its phrases after the beat of the gong ageng (the big gong that "rules" the ensemble, see: colotomy). The rebab also frequently plays the buka when it is part of the ensemble.

In Malaysia, especially the eastern Malaysian states of Kelantan and northern Terengganu (Besut), Rebab is one of important traditional music instruments. Its appearance is significantly different from rebabs from other regions. It has 3 strings, 3 tuning pegs (telinga), a decorative, detachable headstock (kepala), a skin made of cow's stomach and a small, nipple-like mute mechanism (puting). The Rebab is used in the makyong ensemble, tarik selampit and also in a healing ritual called "Main Peteri".

See also

Byzantine lyra, the medieval bowed instrument of the Byzantine Empire
Ektara, one-string instrument used in traditional music from Bangladesh, Egypt, India, and Pakistan.
Gadulka
Gudok
Gusle
Kamancheh
Kemenche
Kobyz
Lijerica
Lyra of Crete
Rebec
Rubab (instrument)

References

Sources
 Margaret J. Kartomi: On Concepts and Classifications of Musical Instruments. Chicago Studies in Ethnomusicology, University of Chicago Press, 1990

External links

Turkish Rebab Master Ibrahim Metin Ugur
Nay-Nava the encyclopedia of persian music instruments
Rebab
The Rebab
Arabic rababa photo
nuke.liuteriaetnica.it
FERNWOOD, an American music group that uses a Rebab.
Matthaios Tsahouridis

Malaysian musical instruments
Iranian musical instruments
Arabic musical instruments
Bowed string instruments
Gamelan instruments
Indonesian musical instruments
Lebanese musical instruments
Pakistani musical instruments
Sundanese music
Syrian musical instruments
Music of West Java
Islamic music
Arab inventions